Richard Kambo is a Papua New Guinea rugby league footballer who plays as a second row.

Playing career
In 2010 Kambo played for the Newtown Jets in the New South Wales Cup. In 2012 he played for the Port Moresby Vipers.

He is a Papua New Guinea international.

References

External links
Newtown Jets profile

1983 births
Papua New Guinean rugby league players
Papua New Guinea national rugby league team players
Newtown Jets NSW Cup players
Port Moresby Vipers players
Rugby league wingers
Rugby league centres
Papua New Guinean expatriate rugby league players
Expatriate rugby league players in Australia
Papua New Guinean expatriate sportspeople in Australia
Living people